Inka Bause (born 21 November 1968 in Leipzig) is a German schlager singer, TV presenter and actress.

External links 

  
 

1968 births
Living people
Musicians from Leipzig
German television presenters
German women television presenters
German television talk show hosts
German television actresses
Schlager musicians
RTL Group people
ZDF people